The tree of knowledge or tree of philosophy is a metaphor presented by the French philosopher René Descartes in the preface to the French translation of his work Principles of Philosophy to describe the relations among the different parts of philosophy in the shape of a tree. He describes knowledge as a tree. The tree's roots are metaphysics, its trunk is physics, and its branches are all other sciences the principal of which are medicine, mechanics and morals.
This image is often assumed to show Descartes' break with the past and with the categorization of knowledge of the schools.

Description
Descartes is often regarded as the first thinker to emphasize the use of reason to develop the natural sciences. For him, philosophy was a thinking system that embodied all knowledge, as he related in a letter to a French translator:

References

External links

Concepts in epistemology
Concepts in metaphysics
Philosophical analogies
René Descartes
Trees in culture